Maxim Vorovski (October 13, 1989) is an Estonian kickboxer, currently signed with King of Kings (KOK), where he is the interim middleweight champion.

As of July 2021, Combat Press ranks him as the #8 middleweight in the world.

Professional kickboxing career
Vorovski was scheduled to fight  Andrei Manzolo on the undercard of the September 14, 2013 Xplosion Series event. He won the fight by unanimous decision.

Vorovski was scheduled to fight  Carlos De Graca on the March 15, 2014 Xplosion Series event. He won the fight by a third-round technical knockout.

Vorovski fought Alex Trofimov on the undercard of the 2014 Tatneft Cup Final, held on September 13, 2014. He won the fight by unanimous decision.

Vorovski was scheduled to face the Slovakian Vladimir Idranyi at Xplosion 2014 on November 15, 2014. He won the fight by unanimous decision.

Vorovski was scheduled to fight Dawid Kasperski at Xplosion Fight Series 6 on May 9, 2015. He won the fight by unanimous decision.

Vorovski was scheduled to face Sahak Parparyan at Xplosion Fight Series 7 on September 19, 2015. He won the fight by an extra round decision.

Vorovski was scheduled to face Igor Lyapin at KOK in Tallinn on October 17, 2015. He won the fight by a third-round knockout.

Vorovski was scheduled to fight Alexander Oleinik at Nr1 Fight Show on May 13, 2016. He lost the fight by unanimous decision.

Vorovski made his last appearance of 2016 against Cheick Sidibé at Nr1 Fight Show on November 26, 2016. He won the fight by unanimous decision.

Vorovski was scheduled to face Stanislaw Zaniewski at Nr1 Fight Show on May 5, 2017. Vorovski won the fight by a first-round knockout, stopping Zaniewski midway through the round.

Vorovski made his Glory debut against Yassine Ahaggan at Glory 47: Lyon on October 28, 2017. He lost the fight by split decision.

Vorovski was scheduled to face Ertugrul Bayrak at Nr1 Fight Show on May 18, 2018. He won the fight by a third-round knockout, stopping the Turkish fighter at the 1:27 minute mark.

Vorovski faced Yuri Bessmertny at Nr1 Fight show on September 22, 2018. He lost the fight by unanimous decision.

Vorovski was scheduled to face Khalef Ghezal at Nr1 Fight Show Season 12 on November 23, 2019. He won the fight by unanimous decision.

Vorovski was scheduled to fight Andreas Iversen for the interim King of Kings middleweight title at KoK 89 on June 5, 2021. The fight was held at the T1 shopping center, without spectators, due to the COVID-19 pandemic. Vorovski won the fight by unanimous decision, outworking his opponent throughout the five rounds.

Championships and accomplishments
King of Kings
2021 KOK Interim Middleweight Championship

Kickboxing record

|-  style="background:#cfc;"
| 2021-06-05|| Win ||align=left| Andreas Iversen || KOK 89 || Tallinn, Estonia || Decision (Unanimous) || 5 || 3:00
|-
! style=background:white colspan=9 |
|-  style="background:#cfc;"
| 2019-11-23 || Win ||align=left| Khalef Ghezal  || Nr1 Fight Show Season 12 || Tallinn, Estonia || Decision (Unanimous) || 3 || 3:00
|-
|-  style="background:#fbb;"
| 2018-09-22 || Loss ||align=left| Yuri Bessmertny || Nr1 Fight Show || Tallinn, Estonia || Decision (Unanimous) || 3 || 3:00
|-
|-  style="background:#cfc;"
| 2018-05-18 || Win ||align=left| Ertugrul Bayrak || Nr1 Fight Show || Tallinn, Estonia || TKO (Punches) || 3 || 1:27
|-
|-  style="background:#fbb;"
| 2017-10-28 || Loss ||align=left| Yassine Ahaggan || Glory 47: Lyon || Lyon, France || Decision (Split) || 3 || 3:00
|-
|-  style="background:#cfc;"
| 2017-05-05 || Win ||align=left| Stanislaw Zaniewski || Nr1 Fight Show || Tallinn, Estonia || KO || 1 || 1:43
|-
|-  style="background:#cfc;"
| 2016-11-26 || Win ||align=left| Cheick Sidibé || Nr1 Fight Show || Tallinn, Estonia || Decision (Unanimous) || 3 || 3:00
|-
|-  style="background:#fbb;"
| 2016-05-13 || Loss ||align=left| Alexander Oleinik || Nr1 Fight Show, Season 5 || Tallinn, Estonia || Decision (Unanimous) || 3 || 3:00
|-
|-  style="background:#cfc;"
| 2015-10-16 || Win ||align=left| Igor Lyapin || KOK in Tallinn || Tallinn, Estonia || KO|| 3 || 
|-
|-  style="background:#cfc;"
| 2015-09-12 || Win ||align=left| Sahak Parparyan || Xplosion Fight Series 7 || Tallinn, Estonia || Decision (Unanimous) || 3 || 3:00
|-
|-  style="background:#cfc;"
| 2015-05-09 || Win ||align=left| Dawid Kasperski || Xplosion Fight Series 6 || Tallinn, Estonia || Decision (Unanimous) || 3 || 3:00
|-
|-  style="background:#cfc;"
| 2014-11-15 || Win ||align=left| Vladimir Idranyi || Xplosion 2014 || Tallinn, Estonia || Decision (Unanimous) || 3 || 3:00
|-
|-  style="background:#cfc;"
| 2014-09-13 || Win ||align=left|  Alex Trofimov || Tatneft Cup 2014 Final || Kazan, Russia|| Decision (Unanimous) || 3 || 3:00
|-
|-  style="background:#cfc;"
| 2014-03-15 || Win ||align=left|  Carlos De Graca || Xplosion 2014  || Tallinn, Estonia || TKO || 3 || 
|-
|-  style="background:#cfc;"
| 2013-09-14|| Win ||align=left|  Andrei Manzolo || Xplosion || Tallinn, Estonia || Decision (Unanimous) || 3 || 3:00
|-
|-  style="background:#fbb;"
| 2012-02-23 || Loss ||align=left| Dzhabar Askerov || United Glory 15 || Moscow, Russia || Ex.Round. Decision || 4 || 3:00
|-
|-  style="background:#fbb;"
| 2010-10-16 || Loss ||align=left| Robin van Roosmalen || United Glory 12: 2010-2011 World Series Quarterfinals || Amsterdam, Netherlands || Decision (Unanimous) || 3 || 3:00 
|-
| colspan=9 | Legend:

See also
 List of male kickboxers

References

Living people
1989 births
Estonian male kickboxers
Sportspeople from Tallinn
Middleweight kickboxers
King of Kings champions